Illigera rhodantha is a species of liana in the family Hernandiaceae.  It is found in subtropical and tropical forests of China and Indo-China; its Vietnamese name is dây ba chẽ.  The Catalogue of Life lists the subspecies I. rhodantha dunniana.

References

External links 
Description & photos on www.fpcn.net (retrieved 12 March 2018)

Hernandiaceae
Flora of Indo-China